Barmer - Guwahati Express is an Express train belonging to Northeast Frontier Railway zone that runs between Barmer in Rajasthan and  Guwahati in Assam. It is currently being operated with 15631/15632 train numbers on bi-weekly basis.

Service

The 15631/Barmer - Guwahati Express has an average speed of 49 km/hr and covers 2454 km in 50 hrs. 15632/Guwahati - Barmer Express has an average speed of 53 km/hr and covers  2454 km in 46 hrs 30 mins.

Route and halts 

The important halts of the train are :

RAJASTHAN
 
 
 Samdari
 
 
 
 

UTTAR PRADESH
 
 
 
 
 Pt. Deen Dayal Upadhyay Junction

BIHAR
 
 
 

WEST BENGAL
 
 
 
 

ASSAM

Coach composite

The train consists of 23 coaches :

 1 AC II Tier
 3 AC III Tier
 12 Sleeper Coaches
 4 General
 2 Second-class Luggage/parcel van
 1 Pantry Car

Traction

As the route is yet to be fully electrified, it is hauled by a Bhagat Ki Kothi Diesel Loco Shed based WDP-4 locomotive from Barmer up to Agra Fort handing over to a Kanpur Electric Loco Shed or Mughalsarai Electric Loco Shed based WAM-4. From Mughalsarai it is hauled by a Guwahati Diesel Loco Shed or Malda Diesel Loco Shed based WDM-3A locomotive for the remainder of the journey until Guwahati.

Rake Sharing 

The train is attached to 25631/25632 Bikaner - Guwahati Express at Merta Road.

See also 

 Barmer railway station
 Guwahati railway station
 Bikaner - Guwahati Express

Notes

References

External links 
 15631/Barmer - Guwahati Express
 15632/Guwahati - Barmer Express

Transport in Guwahati
Transport in Barmer, Rajasthan
Rail transport in Rajasthan
Rail transport in Bihar
Rail transport in Uttar Pradesh
Rail transport in West Bengal
Rail transport in Assam
Express trains in India
Railway services introduced in 2002
2002 establishments in India